The 1907 Kansas State Aggies football team represented the Kansas State Agricultural College during the 1907 college football season.

Schedule

References

Kansas State
Kansas State Wildcats football seasons
Kansas State Aggies football